Christian Tanguay (born August 4, 1962) is a Canadian retired ice hockey player. As a youth, he played in the 1975 Quebec International Pee-Wee Hockey Tournament with a minor ice hockey team from Villeneuve. He later played two games in the National Hockey League with the Quebec Nordiques during the 1981–82 season.

Career statistics

Regular season and playoffs

References

External links
 

1962 births
Living people
Canadian ice hockey right wingers
Fredericton Express players
Chamonix HC players
Canadian expatriate ice hockey players in Italy
Ice hockey people from Quebec City
Milwaukee Admirals players
Muskegon Lumberjacks players
Quebec Nordiques draft picks
Quebec Nordiques players
Trois-Rivières Draveurs players
Canadian expatriate ice hockey players in the United States
Canadian expatriate ice hockey players in France